Nomoneas are a group of islands of Chuuk Lagoon, Chuuk, Micronesia.

References 

Islands of Chuuk State